François-Joseph Double (1776–1842) was a French physician and co-founder of the Académie Nationale de Médecine.

Biography

Early life
He was born on 11 March 1776 in Verdun-sur-Garonne, Tarn-et-Garonne, France. His family, the Double family, had been ennobled in 1378. His grandfather and father were both Apothecaries. He studied in Montpellier, where he was taught in Latin. He moved to Paris in 1803.

Career
He started his career as an apothecary in Paris. He served as a physician in the French-Spanish War of 1793.

As a physician, he developed the accurate observation of the clinical signs of illness, and studied the unaided auscultation of respiratory and cardiac ailments. He also described tubal breathing and pulmonary rales or crackles. He listened to the heart and focused on problems of the heartbeat and unusual sounds, but he failed to link them to any specific ailment. Shortly after, René Laennec (1781-1826) invented the stethoscope and developed aided auscultation. He wrote two books and many reports, for example about diseases like croup and cholera.

In 1832 he co-founded the Académie Nationale de Médecine with Antoine Portal (1742-1832). King Louis Philippe I (1773-1850), who reigned from  1830 to 1848, offered him another peerage should he renounce his medical practise, but he refused.

Death
He died on 12 June 1842 in Paris, and was buried in the Père Lachaise Cemetery in Paris.

Legacy
His family owns the winery Château de Beaupré in Saint-Cannat, started in 1890 by Baron Emile Double (1869-1938).

Bibliography

Primary sources
Traité du croup (1811).
Séméiologie générale ou traité des signes et de leur valeur dans les maladies (3 volumes, Paris, Croullebois).

Secondary sources
Michel Suspène, Docteur François-Joseph Double, un itinéraire médical, en hommage à l'Académie de médecine (CDDP de Tarn-et-Garonne, Montauban, 2002).

References

1776 births
1842 deaths
19th-century French physicians
Members of the French Academy of Sciences
Burials at Père Lachaise Cemetery
18th-century French physicians